Qux or variation, may refer to:

 Yauyos–Chincha Quechua (ISO 639 language code: qux), a South American language
 Quadra FNX Mining (stock ticker: QUX), a Canadian mining company
 Qüxü County (geocode QUX), Tibet, China; see List of administrative divisions of the Tibet Autonomous Region
 qux (computer science), a commonly defined metasyntactic variable
 Qux (programming), a common placeholder name
 QUX (radiotelegraphy), a Q-code encoding the phrase Do you have any navigational warnings or gale warnings in force?
 Unicode symbol U+A40D (qux), see Yi Syllables

See also

 "qux", a word in the Chitimacha language